"Angels on My Side" is a song by English singer and songwriter Rick Astley. It was released as a digital download in the United Kingdom on 13 May 2016 as the second single from his seventh studio album 50 (2016). The song has charted in Belgium and Hungary. The song was written and produced by Astley and is performed in the key of G minor.

In 2019, Astley recorded and released a 'Reimagined' version of the song for his album The Best of Me, which features a new piano arrangement.

Music video
A music video to accompany the release of "Angels on My Side" was first released onto YouTube on 9 June 2016 at a total length of three minutes and twenty-five seconds.

Track listing

Chart performance

Weekly charts

Release history

References

2016 songs
2016 singles
Rick Astley songs
Songs written by Rick Astley